Daniel Albert (born 7 April 1971) is a former Israeli footballer.

Honours
 Israel State Cup runner-up: 1996

References

External links
 
 

1971 births
Living people
Jewish Israeli sportspeople
Association football defenders
Footballers from Rehovot
Maccabi Sha'arayim F.C. players
Hapoel Rishon LeZion F.C. players
Maccabi Herzliya F.C. players
Liga Leumit players
Israeli Premier League players
Israeli footballers